This is a list of notable science-fiction authors, in alphabetical order:

A

Dafydd ab Hugh (born 1960)
Alexander Abasheli (1884–1954)
Edwin Abbott Abbott (1838–1926)
Kōbō Abe (1924–1993)
Robert Abernathy (1924–1990)
Dan Abnett (born 1965)
Daniel Abraham (born 1969)
Forrest J Ackerman (1916–2008)
Douglas Adams (1952–2001)
Robert Adams (1932–1990)
Ann Aguirre (born 1970)
Jerry Ahern (1946–2012)
Jim Aikin (born 1948)
Alan Burt Akers (1921–2005) (pseudonym of Kenneth Bulmer)
Tim Akers (born 1972)
Brian Aldiss (1925–2017)
David M. Alexander (born 1945)
Grant Allen (1848–1899)
Roger MacBride Allen (born 1957)
Hans Joachim Alpers (1943–2011)
Steve Alten (born 1959)
Genrich Altshuller (1926–1998)
Kingsley Amis (1922–1995)
Paul Rafaelovich Amnuél (born 1944)
Charlie Jane Anders (born 1969)
Kevin J. Anderson (born 1962)
Poul Anderson (1926–2001)
Jean-Pierre Andrevon (born 1937)
Arlan Andrews (born 1940)
Patricia Anthony (1947–2013)
Piers Anthony (born 1934)
Christopher Anvil (1925–2009) (pseudonym of Harry C. Crosby)
K. A. Applegate (born 1956)
E.L. Arch (1922–1988) (pseudonym of Rachel Cosgrove Payes)
Eleanor Arnason (born 1942)
Robert Arthur (1909–1969)
Catherine Asaro (born 1955)
Neal Asher (born 1961)
Francis Leslie Ashton (1904–1994)
Pauline Ashwell (1928–2015)
Isaac Asimov (1920–1992)
Janet Asimov (1926–2019)
Nancy Asire (1945–2021)
Robert Asprin (1946–2008)
Francis Henry Atkins (1847–1927)
A. A. Attanasio (born 1951)
Margaret Atwood (born 1939)
Ayerdhal (1959–2015)

B

Richard Bachman (pseudonym of Stephen King)
Paolo Bacigalupi (born 1972)
Hilary Bailey (1936–2017)
Robin Wayne Bailey (born 1952)
Kage Baker (1952–2010)
Scott Baker (born 1947)
J. G. Ballard (1930–2009)
Edwin Balmer (1883–1959)
Iain M. Banks (1954–2013)
Michael A. Banks (born 1951)
Raymond E. Banks (1918–1996) (also known as Ray Banks, Ray E. Banks, R.E. Banks, and Fred Freair)
Marek Baraniecki (born 1954)
Miquel Barceló (1948–2021)
René Barjavel (1911–1985)
Wayne Barlowe (born 1958)
Arthur K. Barnes (1911–1969)
John Barnes (born 1957)
Steven Barnes (born 1952)
William Barnwell (born 1943)
Donald Barr (1921–2004)
João Barreiros (born 1952)
William Barton (born 1950)
T. J. Bass (1932–2011) (pseudonym of Thomas J. Bassler)
Harry Bates (1900–1981)
L. Frank Baum (1856–1919)
John Baxter (born 1939)
Stephen Baxter (born 1957)
Georgy Baydukov (1907–1994)
Barrington J. Bayley (1937–2008)
Elizabeth Bear (born 1971)
Greg Bear (born 1951)
Jerome Beatty Jr (1918–2002)
Charles Beaumont (1929–1967)
Vladimir Beekman (1929–2009)
Ugo Bellagamba (born 1972)
Edward Bellamy (1850–1898)
Alexander Belyaev (1884–1942)
Andrei Belyanin (born 1967)
Don Bendell (born 1947) (pseudonym of Ron Stillman)
Gregory Benford (born 1941)
Donald R. Bensen (1927–1997)
J. D. Beresford (1873–1947)
Fyodor Berezin (born 1960)
Cyrano de Bergerac (1619–1655)
Jack Bertin (1913–1983) (pseudonym of Peter B. Germano)
Alfred Bester (1913–1987)
Bruce Bethke (born 1955)
Ambrose Bierce (1842 – c. 1914)
Lloyd Biggle, Jr. (1923–2002)
Eando Binder (joint pseudonym of Earl (1904–1966) and Otto (1911–1974) Binder)
John Birmingham (born 1964)
David Bischoff (1951–2018)
Michael Bishop (born 1945)
Terry Bisson (born 1942)
Jerome Bixby (1923–1998)
Malorie Blackman (born 1962)
Jayme Lynn Blaschke (born 1969)
James Blaylock (born 1950)
James Blish (1921–1975)
Robert Bloch (1917–1994)
Alexander Bogdanov (1873–1928)
Maya Kaathryn Bohnhoff (born 1954)
Nelson S. Bond (1908–2006)
Kevin Bokeili (1963–2014)
John Boland (1913–1976)
Pierre Bordage (born 1955)
François Bordes (1919–1981)
Anthony Boucher (1911–1968) (pseudonym of William A.P. White)
Pierre Boulle (1912–1994)
Sydney James Bounds (1920–2006)
Louis Henri Boussenard (1847–1910)
Ben Bova (1932–2020)
Leigh Brackett (1915–1978)
Ray Bradbury (1920–2012)
Marion Zimmer Bradley (1930–1999)
Gillian Bradshaw (born 1956)
Johanna Braun (1929–2008)
Mark Brandis (1931–2000)
Miles J. Breuer (1889–1945)
Reginald Bretnor (1911–1992)
David Brin (born 1950)
Jason V Brock (born 1970)
Damien Broderick (born 1944)
Kristi Brooks (born 1980)
Max Brooks (born 1972)
Terry Brooks (born 1944)
John Brosnan (1947–2005)
Eric Brown (born 1960)
Fredric Brown (1906–1972)
James Cooke Brown (1921–2000)
Rosel George Brown (1926–1967)
Simon Brown (born 1956)
John Brunner (1934–1995)
Steven Brust (born 1955)
Edward Bryant (1945–2017)
Valery Bryusov (1873–1924)
Tobias S. Buckell (born 1979)
Algis Budrys (1931–2008)
Vitaly Bugrov (1938–1994)
Lela E. Buis (fl. 1978–present)
Lois McMaster Bujold (born 1949)
Mikhail Bulgakov (1891–1940)
Faddey Bulgarin (1789–1859)
Kenneth Bulmer (1921–2005)
Kir Bulychev (1934–2003)
Chris Bunch (1943–2005)
David R. Bunch (1925–2000)
Anthony Burgess (1917–1993)
Sue Burke (born 1955)
Yuli Burkin (born 1960)
Arthur J. Burks (1898–1974)
Edgar Rice Burroughs (1875–1950)
Michael A. Burstein (born 1970)
F. M. Busby (1921–2005)
Aleksandr Bushkov (born 1956)
Alain Le Bussy (1947–2010)
Jim Butcher (born 1971)
Octavia E. Butler (1947–2006)
Stuart J. Byrne (1913–2011)

C

Pat Cadigan (born 1953)
Jack Cady (1932–2004)
Martin Caidin (1927–1997)
Italo Calvino (1923–1985)
Jack Campbell (born 1956)
John W. Campbell, Jr. (1910–1971) (also known as Don A. Stuart)
Karel Čapek (1890–1938)
Paul Capon (1912–1969)
Orson Scott Card (born 1951)
Joseph Carne-Ross (1846–1911)
Terry Carr (1937–1987)
Lin Carter (1930–1988)
Cleve Cartmill (1908–1964)
Jeffrey Carver (born 1949)
Jay Caselberg (born 1958)
Beth Cato (born 1980)
Hugh B. Cave (1910–2004)
Franci Cerar (fl. 1970s)
Jack L. Chalker (1944–2005)
Joël Champetier ( 1957–2015)
A. Bertram Chandler (1912–1984)
Suzy McKee Charnas (born 1939)
Daína Chaviano (born 1960)
J. Kathleen Cheney (born 1964)
C. J. Cherryh (born 1942)
Ted Chiang (born 1967)
Charles Chilton (1917–2013)
John Christopher (1922–2012) (pseudonym of Samuel Youd)
Richard Chwedyk (born 1955)
Massimo Citi (born 1955)
Charles Heber Clark (1841–1915) (also known as Max Adeler and John Quill)
Arthur C. Clarke (1917–2008)
Jo Clayton (1939–1998)
Hal Clement (1922–2003) (pseudonym of Harry Clement Stubbs)
John Cleve (1934–2013) (pseudonym of Andrew J. Offutt)
Mark Clifton (1906–1963)
Ernest Cline (born 1972)
Mildred Clingerman (1918–1997)
Brenda Clough (born 1955)
John Clute (born 1940)
Stanton A. Coblentz (1896–1982)
Robbie Coburn (born 1994)
Theodore Cogswell (1918–1987)
Frona Eunice Wait Colburn (1859–1946)
Allan Cole (1943–2019)
Robert William Cole (1869–1937)
Eoin Colfer (born 1965)
Erroll Collins (1906–1991) (pseudonym of Ellen Edith Hannah Redknap)
Suzanne Collins (born 1962)
Juanita Coulson (born 1933)
David G. Compton (born 1930)
Michael Coney (1932–2005)
Groff Conklin (1904–1968)
Storm Constantine (1956–2021)
Glen Cook (born 1944)
Hugh Cook (1956–2008)
Paul Cook (born 1950)
Rick Cook (1944–2022)
Brenda Cooper (born 1960)
Edmund Cooper (1926–1982)
Alfred Coppel (1921–2004)
James S. A. Corey (joint pseudonym of Daniel Abraham and Ty Franck)
Larry Correia (born 1977)
Richard Cowper (1926–2002) (pseudonym John Middleton Murry, Jr. used when writing science fiction)
Erle Cox (1873–1950)
John G. Cramer (born 1934)
Michael Crichton (1942–2008)
Robert Cromie (1855–1907)
John Crowley (born 1942)
Andrew Crumey (born 1961)
Ray Cummings (1887–1957)
Philippe Curval (born 1929)
Julie E. Czerneda (born 1955)

D

Roald Dahl (1916–1990)
Brian Daley (1947–1996)
John Dalmas (1926–2017)
James Dashner (born 1972)
Tony Daniel (born 1963)
Jack Dann (born 1945)
Maurice Georges Dantec (1959–2016)
Dennis Danvers (born 1947)
Clark Darlton (1920–2005) (pseudonym of Walter Ernsting)
Avram Davidson (1923–1993)
Chan Davis (1926–2022) (pseudonym of Dr. Chandler Davis)
Vox Day (born 1968)
L. Sprague de Camp (1907–2000)
Antonio de Macedo (1931–2017)
James De Mille (1833–1880)
Marianne de Pierres (born 1961)
Stephen Dedman (born 1959)
Lester del Rey (1915–1993)
Miriam Allen deFord (1888–1975)
Samuel R. Delany (born 1942)
Martha deMey Clow (1932–2010)
Bradley Denton (born 1958)
Charles Derennes (1882–1930)
August Derleth (1909–1971)
A.J. Deutsch (1918–1969)
Graham Diamond (born 1949)
Philip K. Dick (1928–1982)
Gordon R. Dickson (1923–2001)
Lyuben Dilov (1927–2008)
Dougal Dixon (born 1947)
William C. Dietz (born 1945)
Thomas M. Disch (1940–2008)
Alfred Döblin (1878–1957)
Cory Doctorow (born 1971)
Stephen R. Donaldson (born 1947)
Alain Dorémieux (1933–1998)
Sonya Dorman (1924–2005)
Candas Dorsey (born 1952)
Ian Douglas (born 1950) (pseudonym of William H. Keith, Jr.)
Terry Dowling (born 1947)
Arthur Conan Doyle (1859–1930)
Debra Doyle (1952–2020)
Gardner Dozois (1947–2018)
David Drake (born 1945)
Tananarive Due (born 1966)
Catherine Dufour (born 1966)
Jacek Dukaj (born 1974)
Jean-Claude Dunyach (born 1957)
Nictzin Dyalhis (1873–1942)

E

C. M. Eddy, Jr. (1896–1967)
G. C. Edmondson (1922–1995)
George Alec Effinger (1947–2002)
Ivan Antonovich Efremov (1907–1972) (in Russian Иван Антонович Ефремов)
Greg Egan (born 1961)
Gordon Eklund (born 1945)
Suzette Haden Elgin (1936–2015)
E. C. Eliott (1908–1971) (pseudonym of Reginald Alec Martin)
William B. Ellern (born 1933)
Harlan Ellison (1934–2018)
Phyllis Eisenstein (1946–2020)
Roger Elwood (1933–2007)
Victor Rousseau Emanuel (1879–1960)
Carol Emshwiller (1921–2019)
M. J. Engh (born 1933)
George Allan England (1877–1936)
Inge Eriksen (1935–2015)
Steven Erikson (born 1959) pseudonym of Steve Rune Lundin
Walter Ernsting (1920–2005)
Andreas Eschbach (born 1959)
Kelley Eskridge (born 1960)
Valerio Evangelisti (1952–2022)
Christopher Evans (born 1951)
E. Everett Evans (1893–1958)

F

Paul W. Fairman (1916–1977)
Jane Fancher (born 1952)
Ralph Milne Farley (1887–1963) (pseudonym of Roger Sherman Hoar)
Philip José Farmer (1918–2009)
Nabil Farouk (1956–2020)
Howard Fast (1914–2003)
John Russell Fearn (1908–1960)
Cynthia Felice (born 1942) ISFDB
Brad Ferguson (born 1953)
Paul Di Filippo (born 1954)
Sheila Finch (born 1935)
Jack Finney (1911–1995)
Eliot Fintushel (born 1948)
Nicholas Fisk (1923–2016) (pseudonym of David Higginbottom)
Francis Flagg (1898–1946) (pseudonym of George Henry Weiss)
Camille Flammarion (1842–1925)
Eric Flint (1947–2022)
Homer Eon Flint (1888–1924)
Michael Flynn (born 1947)
Charles L. Fontenay (1917–2007)
Jeffrey Ford (born 1955)
John M. Ford (1957–2006)
William R. Forstchen (born 1950)
E. M. Forster (1879–1970)
Robert L. Forward (1932–2002)
Richard Foss (born 1956)
Alan Dean Foster (born 1946)
M. A. Foster (1939–2020)
Karen Joy Fowler (born 1950)
Gardner Fox (1911–1986)
Randall Frakes (born 1947) ISFDB
Herbert W. Franke (1927–2022)
Yves Fremion (born 1940)
C. S. Friedman (born 1957)
Oscar J. Friend (1897–1963)
Esther Friesner (born 1951)

G

Neil Gaiman (born 1960)
Raymond Z. Gallun (1911–1994)
Arnould Galopin (1865–1934)
Daniel F. Galouye (1920–1976)
Charles E. Gannon (born 1960)
James Alan Gardner (born 1955)
Martin Gardner (1914–2010)
Richard Garfinkle (fl. 1990s)
Randall Garrett (1927–1987)
Laurent Genefort (born 1968)
Mary Gentle (born 1956)
Peter George (1924–1966)
Hugo Gernsback (1884–1967) (namesake of the Hugo Award)
David Gerrold (born 1944)
Mark S. Geston (born 1946)
Edward Gibson (born 1936)
Gary Gibson (born 1965)
William Gibson (born 1948)
John Ulrich Giesy (1877–1947)
Alexis A. Gilliland (born 1931)
John Glasby (1928–2011)
John Gloag (1896–1981)
Molly Gloss (born 1944)
Dmitry Glukhovsky (born 1979)
Parke Godwin (1929–2013)
Tom Godwin (1915–1980)
Jacques Goimard (1934–2012)
H. L. Gold (1914–1996)
Lee Gold (born 1942)
Stephen Goldin (born 1947)
Lisa Goldstein (born 1953)
Kathleen Ann Goonan (1952–2021)
Rex Gordon (1917–1998) (pseudonym of Stanley Bennett Hough)
Richard Gordon (1947–2009)
Phyllis Gotlieb (1926–2009)
Ron Goulart (1933–2022)
Steven Gould (born 1955)
Charles L. Grant (1942–2006)
Dominic Green (born 1967)
Roland J. Green (1944–2021)
Simon R. Green (born 1955)
A. T. Greenblatt (fl. 2011–present)
Colin Greenland (born 1954)
William Greenleaf (born 1948)
Percy Greg (1836–1889)
Lois Gresh (born 1965)
George Griffith (1857–1906)
Nicola Griffith (born 1960)
Jon Courtenay Grimwood (born 1953)
Ken Grimwood (1944–2003)
Alexander Gromov (in Russian Алекса́ндр Никола́евич Грóмов)
Martin Grzimek (born 1950)
Wyman Guin (1915–1989)
Eileen Gunn (born 1945)
James E. Gunn (1923–2020)

H

PJ Haarsma (born 1964)
Karen Haber (born 1955)
H. Rider Haggard (1856–1925)
Ronald M. Hahn (born 1948)
Isidore Haiblum (1935–2012)
Jack C. Haldeman II (1941–2002)
Joe Haldeman (born 1943)
Austin Hall (1885–1933)
Barbara Hambly (born 1951)
Edmond Hamilton (1904–1977)
Peter F. Hamilton (born 1960)
Elizabeth Hand (born 1957)
Otfrid von Hanstein (1869–1959)
Lee Harding (born 1937)
Charles L. Harness (1915–2005)
Clare Winger Harris (1891–1968)
Harry Harrison (1925–2012)
M. John Harrison (born 1945)
Henry Hasse (1913–1977)
Simon Hawke (born 1951)
Peter Heck (born 1941)
Robert A. Heinlein (1907–1988)
Zenna Henderson (1917–1983)
Brian Herbert (born 1947)
Frank Herbert (1920–1986)
Paul van Herck (1938–1989)
Philip E. High (1914–2006)
Douglas Hill (1935–2007)
Ernest Hill (1915–2003)
Charles Howard Hinton (1853–1907)
Christopher Hinz (born 1951)
Morioka Hiroyuki (born 1962) (in Japanese 森岡浩之)
Christopher Hodder-Williams (1926–1995)
P. C. Hodgell (born 1951)
William Hope Hodgson (1877–1918)
E. T. A. Hoffmann (1776–1822)
Lee Hoffman (1932–2007)
Ludvig Holberg (1684–1754)
H. H. Hollis (1921–1977) (pseudonym of Ben Neal Ramey)
James P. Hogan (1941–2010)
Elizabeth Holden (1943–2013)
Robert Holdstock (1948–2009)
Nalo Hopkinson (born 1960)
Shinichi Hoshi (1926–1997)
Rokheya Sakhawat Hossain (Begum Rokheya) (1880? – 1932)
Hayden Howard (1925–2014)
Robert Ervin Howard (1906–1936)
Hugh Howey (born 1975)
Fred Hoyle (1915–2001)
L. Ron Hubbard (1911–1986)
Marek Huberath (born 1954)
Matt Hughes (born 1949)
Monica Hughes (1925–2003)
Kameron Hurley (born 1980)
Edna Mayne Hull (1905–1975)
Cyril Hume (1900–1966)
Stephen Hunt (born 1966)
Dave Hutchinson (born 1960)
Aldous Huxley (1894–1963)

I

Dean Ing (1931–2020)
Dragutin Ilić (1858–1926)
Emmi Itäranta (born 1976)
Kazuo Ishiguro (born 1954)
Muhammed Zafar Iqbal (born 1952)
Simon Ings (born 1965)

J

Muriel Jaeger (1892–1969)
John Jakes (born 1932)
Malcolm Jameson (1891–1945)
Phil Janes (fl. 1993–present)
Laurence Janifer (1933–2002)
N.K. Jemisin (born 1972)
P. C. Jersild (born 1935)
Wolfgang Jeschke (1936–2015)
K. W. Jeter (born 1950)
Michel Jeury (1934–2015)
Xia Jia (born 1984)
George Clayton Johnson (1929–2015)
D. F. Jones (1917–1981)
Gwyneth Jones (born 1952)
Neil R. Jones (1909–1988)
Raymond F. Jones (1915–1994)
Diana Wynne Jones (1934–2011)
Robert Jordan (1948–2007)
M. K. Joseph (1914–1981)
Emmanuel Jouanne (1960–2008)
Theodore Judson (born 1951)
Unno Juza (1897–1949)

K

Franz Kafka (1883–1924)
Janet Kagan (1946–2008)
Michael Kandel (born 1941)
Colin Kapp (1928–2007)
Alexander Kazantsev (1906–2002)
Joseph E. Kelleam (1913–1975)
David H. Keller (1880–1966)
James Patrick Kelly (born 1951)
Rick Kennett (born 1956)
Steven L. Kent (born 1960)
Katharine Kerr (born 1944)
John Kessel (born 1950)
Roy Kettle (born 1949)
Alexander Key (1904–1979)
Daniel Keyes (1927–2014)
Gregory Keyes (born 1963)
David Kier (born 1943)
Caitlín R. Kiernan (born 1964)
Lee Killough (born 1942)
Wade A. Kimberlin (born 1970)
Sara King (born 1982)
Stephen King (born 1947)
Vincent King (1935–2000)
Rudyard Kipling (1865–1936)
John Kippax (1915–1974)
Annette Curtis Klause (born 1953)
Donald Kingsbury (born 1929)
Hugh Kingsmill (1889–1949)
David Barr Kirtley (born 1977)
Gérard Klein (born 1937)
Otis Adelbert Kline (1891–1946)
Marko Kloos (fl. 2011–present)
Nigel Kneale (1922–2006)
Boban Knežević (born 1959)
Damon Knight (1922–2002)
Norman L. Knight (1895–1972)
Walter Koenig (born 1936)
Lazar Komarčić (1839–1909)
Dean R. Koontz (born 1945)
Cyril M. Kornbluth (1923–1958)
Mary Robinette Kowal (born 1969)
Tom Kratman (born 1956)
Nancy Kress (born 1948)
Günther Krupkat (1905–1990)
Zoran Krušvar (born 1977)
Michael P. Kube-McDowell (born 1954)
Walter Kubilius (1918–1993)
Michael Kurland (born 1938)
Katherine Kurtz (born 1944)
Henry Kuttner (1915–1958)
David Kyle (1919–2016)

L

W. S. Lach-Szyrma (1841–1915)
R. A. Lafferty (1914–2002)
Louis L'Amour (1908–1988)
Geoffrey Landis (born 1955)
David Langford (born 1953)
Sterling E. Lanier (1927–2007)
Justine Larbalestier (born 1967)
Glen A. Larson (1937–2014)
Kurd Lasswitz (1848–1910)
Philip Latham (1902–1981) (pseudonym of Robert S. Richardson)
Yulia Latynina (born 1966)
Keith Laumer (1925–1993)
Stephen R. Lawhead (born 1950)
W. H. C. Lawrence (fl. 1889)
Ursula K. Le Guin (1929–2018)
Ann Leckie (born 1966)
Gentry Lee (born 1942)
Mary Soon Lee (born 1965)
Sharon Lee (born 1952)
Stan Lee (1922–2018)
Tanith Lee (1947–2015)
Yoon Ha Lee (born 1979)
Fritz Leiber (1910–1992)
Murray Leinster (1896–1975) (pseudonym of Will F. Jenkins)
Stanisław Lem (1921–2006)
Edward M. Lerner (born 1949)
Milton Lesser (1928–2008) (pseudonym of Stephen Marlowe)
Doris Lessing (1919–2013)
Jonathan Lethem (born 1964)
David D. Levine (born 1961)
Paul Levinson (born 1947)
Roger Levy (fl. 2001–present)
C. S. Lewis (1898–1963)
Shariann Lewitt (born 1954)
Jacqueline Lichtenberg (born 1942)
Jean-Marc Ligny (born 1956)
Brad Linaweaver (1952–2019)
Dénis Lindbohm (1927–2005)
David Lindsay (1876–1945)
Liu Cixin (born 1963)
Ken Liu (born 1976)
John Uri Lloyd (1849–1936)
Jack London (1876–1916)
Amelia Reynolds Long (1904–1978)
Frank Belknap Long (1901–1994)
Barry B. Longyear (born 1942)
Jean Lorrah (born 1938)
H. P. Lovecraft (1890–1937)
Archibald Low (1888–1956)
Nathan Lowell (born 1952)
Robert A. W. Lowndes (1916–1998)
Lois Lowry (born 1937)
George Lucas (born 1944)
Lucian (120–after 180)
Nicole Luiken (born 1971)
Sergey Lukyanenko (born 1968)
Sam Lundwall (born 1941)
Duncan Lunan (born 1945)
Richard A. Lupoff (1935–2020)
John Lymington (1911–1983)
Elizabeth A. Lynn (born 1946)
Edward Bulwer-Lytton (1803–1873)

M

Darko Macan (born 1966)
James D. Macdonald (born 1954)
John D. MacDonald (1916–1986) 
F. Gwynplaine MacIntyre (c. 1948–2010)
R. W. Mackelworth (1930–2000)
Katherine MacLean (1925–2019)
Ian R. MacLeod (born 1956)
Ken MacLeod (born 1954)
Angus MacVicar (1908–2001)
Tom Maddox (born 1945)
Charles Eric Maine (1921–1981) (pseudonym of David McIlwain)
Donald Malcolm (1930–1975)
Daryl F. Mallett (born 1969)
Barry N. Malzberg (born 1939)
George Mann (born 1978)
Laurence Manning (1899–1972)
Leo Margulies (1900–1975)
Stephen Marley (born 1946)
Paul Marlowe (fl. 2000–present)
George R. R. Martin (born 1948)
Arkady Martine (born 1985)
David Marusek (born 1951)
Richard Matheson (1926–2013)
Susan R. Matthews (born 1952)
Julian May (1931–2017)
Ged Maybury (born 1953)
Paul J. McAuley (born 1955)
Ed McBain (1926–2005)
Anne McCaffrey (1926–2011)
Wil McCarthy (born 1966)
David McDaniel (1944–1977)
Jack McDevitt (born 1935)
Ian McDonald (born 1960)
William P. McGivern (1918–1982)
Maureen F. McHugh (born 1959)
J. T. McIntosh (1925–2008)
Will McIntosh (born 1962)
Vonda N. McIntyre (1948–2019)
Richard McKenna (1913–1964)
Neil McMahon (born 1949)
Sean McMullen (born 1948)
Mike McQuay (1949–1995)
John Meaney (born 1957)
S. P. Meek (1894–1972)
R. M. Meluch (born 1956)
Miguel Mendonça (born 1973)
Richard C. Meredith (1937–1979)
Robert Merle (1908–2004)
Judith Merril (1923–1997)
A. Merritt (1884–1943)
Sam Merwin Jr. (1910–1996)
Régis Messac (1893–1945)
John Metcalfe (1891–1965)
Melinda Metz (born 1962)
Robert A. Metzger (born 1956)
Stephenie Meyer (born 1973)
John B. Michel (1917–1969)
China Miéville (born 1972)
Victor Milán (1954–2018)
John J. Miller (1954–2022)
P. Schuyler Miller (1912–1974)
Walter M. Miller, Jr. (1923–1996) 
Edward Page Mitchell (1852–1927)
Kirk Mitchell (born 1950)
Syne Mitchell (born 1970)
Naomi Mitchison (1897–1999)
Premendra Mitra (1904–1988)
L. E. Modesitt, Jr. (born 1943)
Judith Moffett (born 1942)
Donald Moffitt (1936–2014)
Thomas F. Monteleone (born 1946)
Elizabeth Moon (born 1945)
Michael Moorcock (born 1939)
Alan Moore (born 1953)
C. L. Moore (1911–1987)
Patrick Moore (1923–2012)
Ward Moore (1903–1978)
Daniel Keys Moran (born 1962)
Dan Morgan (1925–2011)
Richard K. Morgan (born 1965)
Chris Moriarty (born 1968)
A. R. Morlan (1958–2016)
John Morressy (1930–2006)
Chris Morris (born 1946)
Janet Morris (born 1946)
William Morrison (1906–1982) (pseudonym of Joseph Samachson)
James Morrow (born 1947)
Sam Moskowitz (1920–1997)
Pat Murphy (born 1955)

N 

Linda Nagata (born 1960)
Jayant Narlikar (born 1938) (Marathi: जयंत विष्णू नारळीकर)
Grant Naylor (joint pseudonym of Rob Grant and Doug Naylor)
Ondrej Neff (born 1945)
Geoff Nelder (born 1947)
Ray Nelson (1931-2022)
István Nemere (born 1944)
Josef Nesvadba (1926–2005)
Kris Neville (1925–1980)
Eirik Newth (born 1964)
Yuri Nikitin (in Russian Юрий Никитин) (born 1939)
Larry Niven (born 1938)
William F. Nolan (1928–2021)
Jeff Noon (born 1957)
John Norman (born 1931), the Gor series
Lisanne Norman (born 1951)
Eric North (1884–1968) (pseudonym of Bernard Cronin)
Andre Norton (1912–2005) (pseudonym of Alice Mary Norton)
Philip Francis Nowlan (1888–1940)
Alan E. Nourse (1928–1992)
Eric S. Nylund (born 1964)

O

Robert C. O'Brien (1918–1973)
Kevin O'Donnell, Jr. (1950–2012)
Patrick O'Leary (born 1952)
Raven Oak (born 1977)
Vladimir Obruchev (1863–1956)
Edwin Vincent Odle (1890–1942)
Andrew J. Offutt (1934–2013)
Nnedi Okorafor (born 1974)
Chad Oliver (1928–1993)
Bob Olsen (1884–1956)
Jerry Oltion (born 1957)
Karen Osborne (born 1980)
John Ostrander (born 1949)
Jerry Ordway (born 1957)
Marek Oramus (born 1952)
Rebecca Ore (born 1948)
George Orwell (1903–1950) (pseudonym of Eric Arthur Blair)
A. K. Otterness (fl. 1990s)

P

 

Lewis Padgett (joint pseudonym of Henry Kuttner and C. L. Moore)
Michel Pagel (born 1961)
George Pal (1908–1980)
Ada Palmer (born 1981)
David R. Palmer (born 1941)
Jane Palmer (born 1946)
Philip Palmer (born 1960)
Raymond A. Palmer (1910–1977)
Edgar Pangborn (1909–1976)
Alexei Panshin (1940–2022)
Cory Panshin (born 1947)
Christopher Paolini (born 1980)
Richard Parks (born 1955)
James Patterson (born 1947)
Stel Pavlou (born 1970)
Donald G. Payne (1924–2018) (also known as James Vance Marshall, Ian Cameron, and Donald Gordon)
Hayford Peirce (1942–2020)
Charles Pellegrino (born 1953)
Dalibor Perković (born 1974)
Lawrence Person (born 1965)
Steve Perry (born 1947)
Emil Petaja (1915–2000)
Wildy Petoud (born 1957)
John T. Phillifent (1916–1976)
Mark Phillips (joint pseudonym used by Laurence Janifer (1933–2002) and Randall Garrett (1927–1987))
Peter Phillips (1920–2012)
Rog Phillips (1909–1965) (pseudonym of Roger P. Graham)
Eden Phillpotts (1862–1960)
Bal Phondke (born 1939) (Marathi: डॉ. बाळ फोंडके)
John R. Pierce (1910–2002) (also known as J.J. Coupling)
Marge Piercy (born 1936)
H. Beam Piper (1904–1964)
Doris Piserchia (1928–2021)
Brian Plante (born 1956)
Charles Platt (born 1945)
P. J. Plauger (born 1944)
Van Allen Plexico (born 1968)
Edgar Allan Poe (1809–1849)
Frederik Pohl (1919–2013)
Arthur Porges (1915–2006)
Jerry Pournelle (1933–2017)
Gareth L. Powell (born 1970)
Tim Powers (born 1952)
Terry Pratchett (1948–2015)
Fletcher Pratt (1897–1956)
Robert Presslie (1920–2002)
Paul Preuss (born 1942)
Cherie Priest (born 1975)
Christopher Priest (born 1943)
Philip Pullman (born 1946)

Q

Daniel Quinn (1935–2018)
Roberto Quaglia (born 1962)
William Thomas Quick (born 1946)

R

A. Merc Rustad (born 1986)
Adam Roberts (born 1965)
Alastair Reynolds (born 1966)
Anthony M. Rud (1893–1942)
Ayn Rand (1905–1982)
Bill Ransom (born 1945)
Carlos Rasch (1932–1921)
Christopher Rice (born 1978)
Christopher Ride (born 1965)
Christopher Rowley (born 1948)
Christopher Ruocchio
Ed Earl Repp (1901–1979)
Eric Frank Russell (1905–1978)
Esther Rochon (born 1948)
Francis G. Rayer (1921–1981)
Frank M. Robinson (1926–2014)
Gene Roddenberry (1921–1991)
Geoff Ryman (born 1951)
Gustave Le Rouge (1867–1938)
Hannu Rajaniemi (born 1978)
J.-H. Rosny (joint pseudonym of Joseph (1856–1940) and Séraphin (1859–1948) Boex)
Jeanne Robinson (1948–2010)
Joanna Russ (1937–2011)
Joel Rosenberg (1954–2011)
John Ringo (born 1963)
Justina Robson (born 1968)
Keith Roberts (1935–2000)
Kim Stanley Robinson (born 1952)
Kristine Kathryn Rusch (born 1960)
Laura Resnick (born 1962)
Lester del Rey (1915–1993)
M. A. Rothman
Mack Reynolds (1917–1983)
Marta Randall (born 1948)
Mary Doria Russell (born 1950)
Mary Rosenblum (1952–2018)
Maurice Renard (1875–1939)
Melanie Rawn (born 1954)
Miha Remec (1928–2020)
Mike Resnick (1942–2020)
Milton A. Rothman (1919–2001)
Patrick Rothfuss (born 1973)
Philip Reeve (born 1966)
Richard Paul Russo (born 1954)
Robert Reed (born 1956)
Ross Rocklynne (1913–1988)
Rudy Rucker (born 1946)
Satyajit Ray (1921–1992)
Shauna S. Roberts (born 1956)
Simon Rose (born 1961)
Spider Robinson (born 1948)
Stephen Robinett (1941–2004)
Sujatha (1935–2008)
Tom Reamy (1935–1977)
Tony Rothman (born 1953)
William Rotsler (1926–1997)

S

Al Sarrantonio (born 1952)
Allen Steele (born 1958)
Angela Steinmüller (born 1941)
Arkady and Boris Strugatsky ((1925–1991) and (1933–2012) respectively) (in Russian, Аркадий и Борис Стругацкие)
Arthur Sellings (1911–1968)
Bob Shaw (1931–1996)
Brandon Sanderson (born 1975)
Brian Stableford (born 1948)
Bruce Sterling (born 1954)
Bryan Thomas Schmidt (born 1969)
Carl Sagan (1934–1996)
Cathal Ó Sándair (1922–1996)
Charles Sheffield (1935–2002)
Charles Stross (born 1964)
Christopher Stasheff (1944–2018)
Clark Ashton Smith (1893–1961)
Clifford D. Simak (1904–1988)
Cordwainer Smith (1913–1966) (pseudonym of Paul M.A. Linebarger)
Curt Siodmak (1902–2000)
Dan Simmons (born 1948)
Dana Stabenow (born 1952)
David Sherman (born 1958)
Domingo Santos (1941–2018) (pseudonym of Pedro Domingo Mutiñó)
Don Sakers (1958–2021)
E. E. Smith (1890–1965)
Emilio Salgari (1862–1911)
Evelyn E. Smith (1922–2000)
Francis Stevens (1883–1948) (pseudonym of Gertrude Barrows Bennett)
Fred Saberhagen (1930–2007)
G. Harry Stine (1928–1997) (also known as Lee Corey)
Garrett P. Serviss (1851–1929)
George Edgar Slusser (1939–2014)
George H. Scithers (1929–2010)
George H. Smith (1922–1996)
George O. Smith (1911–1981)
Giampietro Stocco (born 1961)
Henry Slesar (1927–2002)
Herman George Scheffauer (1876–1927)
J. Michael Straczynski (born 1954), Babylon 5
J. Neil Schulman (1953–2019)
Jack Skillingstead (born 1955)
Jacques Spitz (1896–1963)
Jacques Sternberg (1923–2006)
James H. Schmitz (1911–1974)
Jerry Sohl (1913–2002)
Joan Slonczewski (born 1956)
Joel Shepherd (born 1974)
Johanna Sinisalo (born 1958)
John E. Stith (born 1947)
John Scalzi (born 1969)
John Shirley (born 1953)
John Sladek (1937–2000)
John Steakley (1951–2010)
Jonathan Swift (1667–1745)
Joseph Schlossel (1902–1977)
Józef Sękowski (1800–1858)
K. H. Scheer (1928–1991)
Karl Schroeder (born 1962)
Karlheinz Steinmüller (born 1950)
L. Neil Smith (1946–2021)
Larry Shaw (1924–1985)
Lawrence M. Schoen (born 1959)
Lewis Shiner (born 1950)
Lucius Shepard (1947–2014)
Luís Filipe Silva (born 1969)
M. P. Shiel (1865–1947)
Manning Lee Stokes (1911–1976)
Marc Stiegler (born 1954)
Margaret St. Clair  (1911–1995) (also known as Idris Seabright)
Martha Soukup (born 1959)
Mary Shelley (1797–1851)
Melinda Snodgrass (born 1951)
Michael Marshall Smith (born 1965)
Michael Shaara (1928–1988)
Michael Shea (1946–2014)
Michael Stackpole (born 1957)
Michael Swanwick (born 1950)
Michael Szameit (1950–2014)
Nancy Springer (born 1948)
Nat Schachner (1895–1955)
Neal Stephenson (born 1959)
Nick Sagan (born 1970)
Nisi Shawl (born 1955)
Norman Spinrad (born 1940)
Olaf Stapledon (1886–1950)
Pamela Sargent (born 1948)
Paul Scheerbart (1863–1915)
R. C. Sherriff (1896–1975)
Ramiro Sanchiz (born 1978)
Richard S. Shaver (1907–1975)
Robert J. Sawyer (born 1960)
Robert Sheckley (1928–2005)
Robert Silverberg (born 1935)
Robert Stallman (1930–1980)
Rod Serling (1924–1975)
Roman Frederick Starzl (1899–1976)
S. M. Stirling (born 1953)
Sam Stone (fl. 2000s–present)
Sharon Shinn (born 1957)
Shumil (born 1957)
Somtow Sucharitkul (also known as S. P. Somtow) (born 1952)
Stanley Schmidt (born 1944)
Steven Spielberg (born 1946)
T. L. Sherred (1915–1985)
Theodore Sturgeon (1918–1985) (pseudonym of Edward Hamilton Waldo)
Thomas N. Scortia (1926–1986)
Tricia Sullivan (born 1968)
William Milligan Sloane III (1906–1974)
William Shatner (born 1931)
William Shunn (born 1967)
William Sleator (1945–2011)
Wilmar H. Shiras (1908–1990)

T

Adrian Tchaikovsky (born 1972)
Aleksei Nikolaevich Tolstoi (born 1882 or 1883, died 1945) (in Russian Алексей Николаевич Толстой)
Aleksey Nikolayevich Tolstoy (1883–1945)
Andrius Tapinas (born 1977)
Arthur Tofte (1902–1980)
Brad R. Torgersen (born 1974)
Charles R. Tanner (1896–1974)
Dennis E. Taylor (fl. 2015–present)
Edwin Charles Tubb (1919–2010)
F. Orlin Tremaine (1899–1956)
Felix Thijssen (1933–2022)
George Tucker (1775–1861)
George Turner (1916–1997)
Harry Turtledove (born 1949)
Howard Tayler (born 1968) 
James Tiptree Jr. (1915–1987) (pseudonym of Alice Sheldon)
John Taine (1883–1960) (pseudonym of Eric Temple Bell)
John Twelve Hawks (fl. 2005–2014)
Karen Traviss (fl. 2004–present)
Kathy Tyers (born 1952)
Lavie Tidhar (born 1976)
Lisa Tuttle (born 1952)
Mark Anthony Taylor (born 1970)
Mark W. Tiedemann (born 1954)
Mary Turzillo (born 1940)
Patrick Tilley (1928–2020)
Robert Thurston (1936–2021)
Sheri S. Tepper (1929–2016)
Stephen Tall (1908–1981) (pseudonym of Compton Newby Crook)
Steve Rasnic Tem (born 1950)
Tade Thompson (fl. 2005–present)
Tais Teng (born 1952) (nom de plume of Thijs van Ebbenhorst Tengbergen)
Theodore L. Thomas (1920–2005)
Tom Terry (born 1963)
Travis S. Taylor (born 1968)
Walter Tevis (1928–1984)
William F. Temple (1914–1989)
William Tenn (1920–2010) (pseudonym of Philip Klass)
Wilson Tucker (1914–2006)
Yoshiki Tanaka (born 1952)

U
Steven Utley (1948–2013)

V

A. E. van Vogt (1912–2000)
Alpheus Hyatt Verrill (1871–1954)
Catherynne M. Valente (born 1979)
Elisabeth Vonarburg (born 1947)
Harl Vincent (1893–1968)
Jack Vance (1916–2013)
James Van Pelt (born 1954)
Jeff VanderMeer (born 1968)
Joan D. Vinge (born 1948)
John Varley (born 1947)
Jules Verne (1828–1905)
Julius Vogel (1835–1899)
Kurt Vonnegut, Jr. (1922–2007)
Pierre Versins (1923–2001)
Robert E. Vardeman (born 1947)
Sydney J. Van Scyoc (born 1939)
Vercors (1902–1991) (pseudonym of Jean Bruller)
Vernor Vinge (born 1944)
Vladimir Vasilyev (born 1967)
Voltaire (1694–1778)

W

Adam Wiśniewski-Snerg (1937–1995)
Alex White (born 1981)
Andy Weir (born 1972)
Angus Wells (1943–2006)
Basil Wells (1912–2003)
Bernard Werber (born 1961)
Bernard Wolfe (1915–1985)
Bryce Walton (1918–1988)
Cherry Wilder (1930–2002)
Chuck Wendig (born 1976)
Colin Wilson (1931–2013)
Connie Willis (born 1945)
D. Harlan Wilson (born 1971)
Dan Wells (born 1977)
David Weber (born 1952)
David Wingrove (born 1954) 
Dennis Wheatley (1897–1977)
Don Webb (born 1960)
Donald A. Wollheim (1914–1990) (various pseudonyms)
Donald Wandrei (1908–1987)
Edgar Wallace (1875–1932)
Edmund Wnuk-Lipinski (1944–2015)
F. L. Wallace (1915–2004) (also known as Floyd Wallace)
F. Paul Wilson (born 1946)
Gene Wolfe (1931–2019)
H. G. Wells (1866–1946)
Howard Waldrop (born 1946)
Hugh Walters (1910–1993)
Ian Wallace (1912–1998)
Ian Watson (born 1943)
Jack Williamson (1908–2006)
Jack Womack (born 1956)
James White (1928–1999) 
Jan Weiss (1892–1972)
Jo Walton (born 1964)
John C. Wright (born 1961)  
John Wyndham (1903–1969) (pseudonym of John Wyndham Parkes Lucas Beynon Harris)
K. D. Wentworth (1951–2012)
Karl Edward Wagner (1945–1994)
Kate Wilhelm (1928–2018)
Lawrence Watt-Evans (born 1954)
Liz Williams (born 1965)
Lynda Williams (born 1958) 
Manly Wade Wellman (1903–1986)
Martha Wells (born 1964)
Michael Z. Williamson (born 1967)
Otto Witt (1875–1923)
Peter Watts (born 1958)
Philip Wylie (1902–1971)
Richard M. Weiner (1930–2020)
Richard Wilson (1920–1987)
Rob Williams 
Robert Anton Wilson (1932–2007)
Robert Charles Wilson (born 1953)
Robert Moore Williams (1907–1977)
Roland C. Wagner (1960–2012)
S. Fowler Wright (1874–1965)
Scott Westerfeld (born 1963)
Sean Williams (born 1967)
Sonny Whitelaw (born 1956) 
Stanley G. Weinbaum (1902–1935)
Stefan Wul (1922–2003) (pseudonym of Pierre Pairault)
Steve White (born 1946)
Suzanne Weyn (born 1955)
Tad Williams (born 1957) 
Ted White (born 1938)
Wallace West (1900–1980)
Walter Jon Williams (born 1953)

Y

Charles Yu (born 1976)
Chelsea Quinn Yarbro (born 1942)
Jane Yolen (born 1939)
Jun'ya Yokota (1945–2019)
Neon Yang (born ?)
Nir Yaniv (born 1972)
Robert Franklin Young (1915–1986)
Tetsu Yano (1923–2004)

Z

Aleksandar Ziljak (born 1963)
Alexander Zelenyj (fl. 2005–present)
Alexander Zorich (born 1973) (joint pseudonym of Yana Botsman and Dmitry Gordevsky)
Andrzej Ziemiański (born 1960)
Arthur Leo Zagat (1896–1949)
David Zindell (born 1952)
George Zebrowski (born 1945)
Janusz Zajdel (1938–1985)
Jerzy Żuławski (1874–1915)
Joseph Zornado (fl. 2000–present)
Mohammad Zafar Iqbal (1952-present)
Pamela Zoline (born 1941)
Rafal A. Ziemkiewicz (born 1964)
Roger Zelazny (1937–1995)
Sarah Zettel (born 1966)
Timothy Zahn (born 1951)
Tully Zetford (pseudonym of Kenneth Bulmer)
Werner Zillig (born 1949)
Yevgeny Zamyatin (1884–1937)
Zoran Živković (born 1948)

See also
Black science fiction
:Category:Science fiction writers by nationality
Internet Speculative Fiction DataBase
List of Clarion South Writers Workshop Instructors
List of Clarion West Writers Workshop alumni
List of Clarion West Writers Workshop instructors
List of Clarion Writers Workshop Alumni
List of Clarion Writers Workshop Instructors
List of fantasy authors
List of horror fiction authors
List of military science fiction works and authors
List of Romanian science fiction writers
List of science fiction editors
Lists of authors
Novelists
Timeline of science fiction
Women science fiction authors

References

Resources
A useful book for looking up authors is A Reader's Guide to Science Fiction, by Baird Searles, Martin Last, Beth Meacham, and Michael Franklin (1979). It also tells you whom else you might like if you like one author.

Other invaluable works include The Encyclopedia of Science Fiction, edited by John Clute and Peter Nicholls (2nd. Ed. 1991), The Mammoth Encyclopedia of Science Fiction, edited by George Mann (1999) ( or ), and Twentieth-Century Science-Fiction Writers, edited by Curtis C. Smith (1981).

External links
Official website for "Russian Science Fiction and Fantasy"
Official website for the Science Fiction and Fantasy Writers of America

Science fiction

Authors